was a Japanese politician who belonged to the Democratic Party of Japan (DPJ) and was a member of the House of Representatives in the Diet (national legislature). A native of Sapporo, Hokkaidō, and graduate of the University of Tokyo, he was elected to the first of his five terms in the House of Representatives in 1969 as a member of the Japan Socialist Party in the electoral district of his late father Setsuo. 
He left the House of Representatives and was elected to be the governor of Hokkaidō. He served for three terms from 1983 to 1995. After finishing his term as governor, he left the Socialist Party, joining the DPJ. In 1996 he was re-elected to the House of Representatives. He is the leader of the most left-leaning faction in the DPJ. After the victory of 2009 elections, then-DPJ President Yukio Hatoyama named him as the next house speaker.

In the 2012 general election Yokomichi lost his single-seat electorate but retained a seat in the Diet through the proportional representation system. He managed to regain his seat in the 2014 election and held it until he retired in 2017.

References

External links 
 Official website in Japanese.

1941 births
2023 deaths
People from Sapporo
University of Tokyo alumni
Governors of Hokkaido
Members of the House of Representatives (Japan)
Speakers of the House of Representatives (Japan)
Social Democratic Party (Japan) politicians
Democratic Party of Japan politicians
21st-century Japanese politicians